Panos Valavanis (Πάνος Βαλαβάνης, born 1954 in Athens) is a Greek classical archaeologist.

Panos Valavanis studied at the University of Athens and the University of Würzburg. Since 1980 he has worked at the University of Athens, where since 2000 he has been a professor extraordinarius in classical archäeology. Valavanis does research on Greek pottery and Greek vase painting, on the architecture and topography of ancient Athens, on ancient technology, and on ancient sports. For his book Games and Sanctuaries in Ancient Greece, a foreword was written by John Boardman. 

Valavanis is a corresponding member of the Deutsches Archäologisches Institut.

Selected publications
 Hysplex. The Starting Mechanism in Ancient Stadia. A Contribution to Ancient Greek Technology, University of California Press, Los Angeles 1999 
 Games and Sanctuaries in Ancient Greece, Getty Publications, Los Angeles 2004.  Review by Paul Christesen in Bryn Mawr Classical Review 2005.01.20

External links
cv of Panos Valavanis (in Greek) at the website of  University of Athens

Classical archaeologists
Archaeologists from Athens
1954 births
Living people
National and Kapodistrian University of Athens alumni
University of Würzburg alumni
Academic staff of the National and Kapodistrian University of Athens